Raoul de Beauvais (fl. mid-13th century) was a trouvère from northeast of Paris. His period of activity is estimated based on his works being clumped with those of other mid-13th-century trouvères in the chansonniers. Six songs are attributed to him, with three also being (probably wrongly) attributed to Jehan Erart. They exhibit great variety of poetical and musical form.

All six songs contain refrains. Each four-line stanza contains three open cadences (every line but the last), but the three-line refrain uses closed cadences. Melodically, however, both the opening lines of the stanzas and of the refrain are similar. Besides these three pieces, Raoul also wrote:
 
 
 (also attributed to Erart)

References
Falck, Robert and John Haines. "Raoul de Beauvais." Grove Music Online. Oxford Music Online. Accessed 20 September 2008.

Trouvères
13th-century French people
Male classical composers